Shintaro Mochizuki (Japanese: 望月 慎太郎, Mochizuki Shintaro, born 2 June 2003) is a Japanese tennis player. He has an ATP career-high singles ranking of world No. 299 achieved on 13 February 2023.

Mochizuki has a career high ITF junior combined ranking of No. 1 achieved on 15 July 2019.

Mochizuki won the 2019 Wimbledon Championships – Boys' singles title after becoming the first Japanese male to reach a Grand Slam juniors singles final. In September that year, he led the Japanese team to win the Junior Davis Cup in Orlando, Florida.

In February 2021, Mochizuki made his ATP main draw debut as a wildcard at the 2021 Singapore Tennis Open where he lost to Altug Celikbilek in straight sets. In March 2021, he qualified for his first ATP Masters 1000 main draw at the 2021 Miami Open having been given a wildcard for the qualifying competition.

ATP Challenger and ITF Future finals

Singles: 1 (0–1)